Qashqa Tappeh (also Romanized as Qāshqā Tappeh; also known as Qashqeh Tappeh) is a village in Qareh Poshtelu-e Bala Rural District, Qareh Poshtelu District, Zanjan County, Zanjan Province, Iran. At the 2006 census, its population was 65, in 16 families.

References 

Populated places in Zanjan County